Dawn Undercover is British writer Anna Dale's second novel, published in 2005 by Bloomsbury Children's Books, for children aged 8-12. It is a humorous mystery adventure book.

Plot summary
Rusty-gate Primary School does not teach espionage and sleuthing, so when Dawn Buckle is asked by S.H.H. (Strictly Hush Hush) to become a highly trained spy with P.S.S.T (Pursuit of Scheming Spies and Traitors) she feels rather at a disadvantage. But showing an incredible ability and very quick thinking she soon finds herself caught up in an incredible adventure to unearth the wicked 'spy-gone-bad' Murdo Meek.

Can Dawn piece together all the parts of the incredible riddle before Murdo does away with his hostage? Can she outwit this master criminal while at the same time keeping herself safe?

Characters
Dawn Buckle
Murdo Meeks
Trudy Harris
Philippa Killingback
Felix Pomeroy-Pitt
Angela Bradshaw.

References

2005 British novels
British children's novels
Children's mystery novels
Junior spy novels
2005 children's books
Bloomsbury Publishing books